Józef Grzesiak (18 February 1941 in Popów, Greater Poland Voivodeship, Poland – 30 May 2020) was a boxer from Poland.

He competed for Poland in the 1964 Summer Olympics held in Tokyo, Japan in the light-middleweight event where he finished in third place, winning a bronze medal.

References

Sports-reference

1941 births
2020 deaths
People from Kalisz County
Olympic boxers of Poland
Olympic bronze medalists for Poland
Boxers at the 1964 Summer Olympics
Olympic medalists in boxing
Sportspeople from Greater Poland Voivodeship
Polish male boxers
Medalists at the 1964 Summer Olympics
Light-middleweight boxers
20th-century Polish people
21st-century Polish people